The Challenge: World Championship is a spin-off of the reality competition series The Challenge.  The series features notable veterans from the MTV flagship series competing alongside the winners and select contestants from four spin-off seasons: The Challenge Argentina: El Desafío, The Challenge: Australia, The Challenge: USA and The Challenge UK.

The series is hosted by the hosts of the four spin-off seasons: Brihony Dawson, Mark Wright, Marley and T.J. Lavin, and premiered on Paramount+ on 8 March 2023.

Background
In February 2022, a new series of international seasons of The Challenge was announced to air later in the year. The series comprises four new editions of The Challenge, which includes The Challenge: USA, The Challenge: Australia, The Challenge Argentina: El Desafío and The Challenge UK. These local renditions are followed by The Challenge: World Championship in which winners and select contestants of each series (known as "Global MVPs") compete again alongside cast members from the flagship MTV series (known as "Challenge legends").

In addition to the title of The Challenge: World Championship champions, the winners of the season also receive US$500,000.

Contestants

Draft selections
After the first elimination, each Global MVP drafted their partner for the season from the Challenge Legends in the order they finished the "Qualifier" challenge.

Each pair was also given symbolic team names of Team Argentina, Team Australia, Team UK or Team USA based on the nationality of the Global MVP:
  Team Argentina
  Team Australia
  Team UK
  Team USA

Format
World Championship consists of a daily challenge, nomination process, winner's selection and an elimination round. The first episode had only the "MVPs" (contestants from the spin-off seasons) competing individually. After the first elimination, each MVP picked their "Legend" partner (players from the flagship series) based on the order they completed the "Qualifier" challenge. The individual and paired format of the game is as follows:
Daily Challenge: Teams compete in a daily challenge where the last-place team is automatically sent to the elimination round. The winning team is immune and earns the ability to select a second team to compete in the elimination round between the two teams later selected at nominations.
Nominations: Teams, besides the winners and losers of the daily challenge, vote for two teams to compete in the elimination round. The two teams that receive the most votes are nominated for elimination.
Eliminations ("The Arena"): At the Arena, the winners from the daily challenge vote between the two nominated teams to select the second team to compete in the elimination round against the last-place team. The winners remain in the competition while the losers are eliminated.

Gameplay

Challenge games
Qualifier: In a special challenge, each MVP individually undergoes a race around the outside of the Cape Town Stadium, completing five checkpoints along the way. The first male and female MVPs to finish wins while the last-place male and female MVPs are automatically sent to the Arena. Additionally, the order MVPs finish determine the order they can select their partner for the season after the first elimination.
Checkpoint 1 (Eat Your Heart Out): Players must consume a foul-tasting meal and two vegan shakes.
Checkpoint 2 (Hammer It Home): Players must use a sledgehammer to hit a tyre proportional to their bodyweight to the end of a lane.
Checkpoint 3 (On a Roll): Players must use a large cement cylinder to roll across a track without touching the ground.
Checkpoint 4 (Weight for It): Players must arrange several weighted cylinders from lightest to heaviest, where the characters printed on the cylinders form an alphanumeric code. They must then recreate the code using tiles at a nearby solving station.
Checkpoint 5 (Plant Your Flag): Players must roll a heavy flagpole with their national flag across a field and plant it at the end to complete the race.
Winners: Grant & Zara
Chain Game: Teams race across several sand dunes to a shipwreck. From the shipwreck, teams must drag a  chain to one of several puzzles, which they must solve by looping the chain around poles to match the diagram. The further the puzzle is from the shipwreck, the easier it is to solve. After solving a puzzle, teams race back to the shipwreck to ring a bell. The first team to finish wins while the last team to finish is automatically sent to the Arena. 
Winners: Jonna & Grant

Arena games
Pole Wrestle: Players begin at the center of the Arena with both hands on a metal pole. The first player to wrestle the pole out of their opponent's hands three times wins. 
Played by: Claudia vs. Kiki
Tether Brawl: One team member begins lying on a sling suspended over the Arena. From the ground, their partner must swing them back and forth so they can collect eight hanging blocks and drop them at their end of the Arena. If a block falls in the center of the Arena, both teams may attempt to claim it. After collecting all eight blocks, the team member on the ground must stack the blocks to form a tower. The first team to assemble their tower wins.
Played by: Jujuy & Nelson vs. KellyAnne & Tristan

Game summary

Bold indicates that the player/team was voted in by the winners.

Episode progress

Competition key
 The contestant won the daily challenge and was immune from elimination.
 The contestant was not selected for the Arena.
 The contestant was nominated for the Arena, but was not selected to compete.
 The contestant came in last place at the daily challenge, but did not have to compete in the Arena.
 The contestant won the elimination round.
 The contestant lost the elimination round and was eliminated.
 The contestant was medically removed from the competition.

Voting progress
In episode 1, each MVP voted individually. From episode 2, teams voted collectively.

Bold indicates winner's vote

Episodes

References

World Championship, The Challenge
Reality television spin-offs
Television shows set in Cape Town
Television shows filmed in South Africa